Jiangzhai may refer to:

 Jiangzhai (姜寨), archaeological site of the Yangshao culture in Xi'an, China
 Jiangzhai, Linquan County (姜寨镇), town in Linquan County, Anhui, China